Gregorio Lavilla (born 29 September 1973) is a Spanish former professional motorcycle road racer. He has raced in MotoGP (full-time in 250s, and part-time in 500s and MotoGP itself), the Superbike World Championship, and the British Superbike Championship, taking the British crown in 2005. For  he raced in WSB for the Ventaxia Honda team, finishing the championship in 12th place. He raced in four rounds of the 2009 WSB series with the Guandalini Racing Ducati team.

Early years
Born in Vandellòs i l'Hospitalet de l'Infant, Tarragona, Spain, Lavilla was the Spanish Superbike champion in 1994, and raced in the 250cc Grand Prix World Championship the next year. He was runner-up in Germany's Superbike championship in 1997, on board a Ducati. In 1998 he first raced in the Superbike World Championship full-time, on a private Ducati, taking two outright podiums. He also made a one-off appearance at the German Grand Prix in the 500 cc class riding for the Honda Movistar Team of former rider Sito Pons. He then spent 3 years with Kawasaki's factory superbike team, finishing 8th overall despite experiencing many crashes in 1999 (including five in a row) and finishing 10th overall in 2000 despite missing four rounds through injury, before a stronger 2001, in which he was the second-highest non-wildcard in Race 1 at Sugo.

For 2002 and 2003 he raced a factory Suzuki, doing what he could on a 750cc 4-cylinder bike which lagged behind the 1000cc Ducatis (and Colin Edwards' Honda in 2002), finishing 5th overall in the relatively weak 2003 championship with 19 top-six finishes including seven podiums, although still not taking a race win. Suzuki did not enter a WSBK team in 2004, and Gregorio remained with them as a factory test rider, substituting for Yukio Kagayama in the BSB series once, and doing 4 MotoGP races for the team. He was released at the end of the season, leaving the way clear for his fairytale 2005.

British Superbike Championship
His victory in the 2005 British Superbike Championship was a major surprise, especially because he had never raced in the championship full-time before, and only got his ride a few days before the season started, initially to replace the injured James Haydon in the Airwaves Ducati team. He started so strongly that the team chose to retain him. He soon established himself ahead of teammate Leon Haslam, and the main rival to the Honda bikes, before a run of 6 wins and 5 second places in the final 11 races saw him take the crown.

He started 2006 in even stronger form, with 6 wins in the first 8 races. His championship lead reached 66 points, but dropped after he crashed out of race 12 at Snetterton. Croft was not a successful meeting for him - a technical problem in race 1 and a fall in race 2 saw his championship lead down to 11 points over Haslam and 20 over Ryuichi Kiyonari's Honda. Further struggles meant that he lost the championship lead, and the final meeting was a disaster - he failed to score in either race, and slipped to 3rd in the championship behind Kiyonari and Haslam. His totals of 8 wins and 10 further podiums were still impressive for a third-place overall finish.

He started 2007 spectacularly, winning the first four races, and also winning race 7. However his form then faded and he finished 4th overall.

World Championship part 2
For  he moved to the Superbike World Championship riding a Honda CBR1000RR for Ventaxia VK Honda as part of the Paul Bird team. The team failed to run near the front, but Lavilla scored points in all but two races, peaking with fourth place in a chaotic first race at Donington Park but more often finishing between 11th and 15th. For  he joined the Pro Ride Honda (formerly Alto Evolution) team, before sponsorship losses forced them to part company with Lavilla and only run a partial schedule[].
In May 2009 Lavilla returned to WSBK with the Guandalini Racing team, initially in a one-race deal to replace the injured Brendan Roberts.  It was subsequently reported that Lavilla would race with Guandalini for the rest of the season, but after four rounds (Kyalami, Miller, Misano and Donington), he was replaced at the team by Italian Matteo Baiocco.

Career statistics

Superbike World Championship

Races by year
(key) (Races in bold indicate pole position) (Races in italics indicate fastest lap)

Grand Prix motorcycle racing

Races by year
(key) (Races in bold indicate pole position, races in italics indicate fastest lap)

Post racing career
In 2012, he joined the Avintia Blusens MotoGP CRT team as crew chief, from the second round of testing onwards. In 2013 he became a member of the new Dorna WorldSBK Orangisation (DWO), to become the WorldSBK Sporting director later.

Personal
His sporting heroes are Mick Doohan, Wayne Rainey and Lance Armstrong. He is unmarried and lives in L'Hospitalet de l'Infant.

References

External links

1973 births
Living people
Motorcycle racers from Catalonia
Spanish motorcycle racers
Superbike World Championship riders
British Superbike Championship riders
Suzuki MotoGP riders
500cc World Championship riders
250cc World Championship riders
Place of birth missing (living people)
MotoGP World Championship riders